Gusenburg is a municipality in the Trier-Saarburg district, in Rhineland-Palatinate, Germany.

References

Municipalities in Rhineland-Palatinate
Trier-Saarburg